Hagen Melzer (born 16 June 1959, in Bautzen) is a former East German middle and long distance runner who specialised in the 3000 m steeplechase.

He won the gold medal at the 1986 European Championships in Stuttgart. A year later he won the silver medal at the 1987 World Championships in Rome, where he set a national record at 8:10.32 minutes. This remained his career best time, and places him second on the German all-time performers list behind Damian Kallabis, who ran in 8:09.48 minutes in 1999. At the Olympic Games he finished tenth in 1988 and did not reach the final in 1992.

Melzer won seven East German national titles, in 1980, 1983 and the years 1985–1989. He represented the sports clubs SC Einheit Dresden and, after the German reunification, Dresdner SC. He won the German title in 1991 for his new club.

References

1959 births
Living people
People from Bautzen
People from Bezirk Dresden
East German male steeplechase runners
East German male long-distance runners
German male steeplechase runners
Dresdner SC athletes
Olympic athletes of East Germany
Olympic athletes of Germany
Athletes (track and field) at the 1988 Summer Olympics
Athletes (track and field) at the 1992 Summer Olympics
World Athletics Championships medalists
European Athletics Championships medalists
Goodwill Games medalists in athletics
Recipients of the Patriotic Order of Merit in silver
Competitors at the 1986 Goodwill Games
Friendship Games medalists in athletics
Sportspeople from Saxony